American country music artist Maren Morris has released six studio albums, three extended plays (EPs), 20 singles, eight charting songs, 13 music videos and has appeared on four albums. Her first three studio offerings were issued on independent labels, beginning with 2005's Walk On. It was followed by If That's All It Takes (2007) and Live Wire (2011).

In 2016, Morris's song "My Church" was her first to reach the top ten of the North American country singles charts. It prompted a recording contract from Columbia Nashville, which resulted in her first major label album titled Hero (2016). The disc reached the top five of the Billboard 200 and topped the Billboard country albums charts. The album spawned three more singles including the top ten songs "I Could Use a Love Song" and "Rich".

In 2018, Morris collaborated with Zedd and Grey on a track called "The Middle". The song became a top ten pop single internationally. She followed with 2019's Girl. The album also topped the Billboard country chart and reached the Billboard 200 top five. Its title track and "The Bones" both became number one country songs. 

In 2021, Morris joined Ryan Hurd on the duet "Chasing After You". She previously teamed with Thomas Rhett, Niall Horan and Sheryl Crow for collaborative single releases. In 2022, Morris released the single "Circles Around This Town" which reached the top ten of the North American country charts. It was included on her sixth studio effort titled Humble Quest. Released in March 2022, Humble Quest peaked at number two on the Billboard country albums chart and number 21 on the Billboard 200.

Studio albums

Extended plays

Singles

As lead artist

As featured artist

Promotional singles

Other charted songs

Other album appearances

Music videos

Notes

References

External links
Official website
Maren Morris at AllMusic

Country music discographies
Discographies of American artists
Discography